Juan Carlos Paz (born 6 September 1944) is a Uruguayan footballer. He played in two matches for the Uruguay national football team in 1967. He was also part of Uruguay's squad for the 1967 South American Championship.

References

1944 births
Living people
Uruguayan footballers
Uruguay international footballers
Place of birth missing (living people)
Association football midfielders
Racing Club de Montevideo players